WPEL-FM is a religious radio station in Montrose, Pennsylvania. It is a non-commercial, listener-supported radio station owned and operated by the Montrose Broadcasting Corporation, a non-profit organization founded by W. Douglas Roe.

History
WPEL, a 1,000 watt daytime station at 800 AM, has been on the air since May 30, 1953. It broadcasts Southern gospel music and Bible teaching programs 24 hours a day, 7 days a week.

WPEL-FM, at 96.5 FM, began broadcasting on June 5, 1961. At 57,000 watts, it is one of the region's most powerful radio stations. Located about halfway between Scranton, Pennsylvania and Binghamton, New York, WPEL-FM serves a potential audience of more than 800,000 listeners in 16 counties of Northeastern Pennsylvania and New York's Southern Tier. It broadcasts a blended format of Bible teaching programs, music and newscasts. The playlist consists of traditional hymns, classical music, beautiful music instrumentals, choral music and classic adult contemporary Christian music.

WPEL-FM began streaming their programming on the world-wide-web on April 17, 2008.

Programming
The primary announcers of WPEL-FM are David MacFadden, Brenda Sheridan, Mark Dorval and Aaron Griggs.

Ownership
The Montrose Broadcasting Corporation also owns and operates radio stations WPGM-AM/FM in Danville, Pennsylvania and WBGM-FM in New Berlin, Pennsylvania.

Translators
In addition to the main transmitter, WPEL-FM is relayed on 4 translators to widen its broadcast area.

External links
 WPEL-FM official website
 List of "grandfathered" FM radio stations in the U.S.

PEL-FM
Southern Gospel radio stations in the United States
PEL-FM
Radio stations established in 1961